Her Dark Past is a film starring Anna Lise Phillips, Kevin Ryan, JR Bourne and Kristina Klebe. The film premiered on the Lifetime Network in 2016. The film was also marketed by the name The Many Faces of Alice in overseas territories.

The film centers around Alice, who is attacked and wakes up with amnesia. With no memory of her past or her attacker, Alice must learn who to trust and face the truth of who she really is.

References

External links

2016 television films
2016 films
Lifetime (TV network) films